Ilyino may refer to:
Ilyino, Bryansk Oblast, a village in Bryansk Oblast, Russia
Ilyino, Kalininsky District, Tver Oblast, name of two villages in Kablukovskoye Rural Settlement of Kalininsky District of Tver Oblast, Russia
Ilyino, Kimrsky District, Tver Oblast, a village in Kimrsky District of Tver Oblast, Russia
Ilyino, Kuvshinovsky District, Tver Oblast, a village in Kuvshinovsky District of Tver Oblast, Russia
Ilyino, Nekrasovo Rural Settlement, Rameshkovsky District, Tver Oblast, a village in Nekrasovo Rural Settlement of Rameshkovsky District of Tver Oblast, Russia
Ilyino, Nikolskoye Rural Settlement, Rameshkovsky District, Tver Oblast, a village in Nikolskoye Rural Settlement of Rameshkovsky District of Tver Oblast, Russia
Ilyino, Sandovsky District, Tver Oblast, name of two villages in Sobolinskoye Rural Settlement of Sandovsky District of Tver Oblast, Russia
Ilyino, Bolshekoshinskoye Rural Settlement, Selizharovsky District, Tver Oblast, a village in Bolshekoshinskoye Rural Settlement of Selizharovsky District of Tver Oblast, Russia
Ilyino, Yeletskoye Rural Settlement, Selizharovsky District, Tver Oblast, a village in Yeletskoye Rural Settlement of Selizharovsky District of Tver Oblast, Russia
Ilyino, Torzhoksky District, Tver Oblast, a village in Torzhoksky District of Tver Oblast, Russia
Ilyino, Udomelsky District, Tver Oblast, a village in Udomelsky District of Tver Oblast, Russia
Ilyino, Zapadnodvinsky District, Tver Oblast, a settlement in Zapadnodvinsky District of Tver Oblast, Russia
Ilyino, name of several other rural localities in Russia

See also
Ilino (disambiguation)
Ilya
Ilyin
Ilyinka
Ilyinsky (disambiguation)